Kolpna, until 1 January 2006 as Kolpny, is an urban locality (an urban-type settlement) in Kolpnyansky District of Oryol Oblast, Russia. Population:

References

Urban-type settlements in Oryol Oblast
Maloarkhangelsky Uyezd